Steffen Lang (born 14 August 1993) is a German professional footballer who plays as a right-back.

Career
Lang was born in Nördlingen.

For the 2015–16 season Lang moved to Arminia Bielefeld.

References

External links
 

1993 births
Living people
German footballers
People from Nördlingen
Sportspeople from Swabia (Bavaria)
Footballers from Bavaria
Association football fullbacks
Germany youth international footballers
VfB Stuttgart II players
Arminia Bielefeld players
FC Viktoria Köln players
SC Verl players
2. Bundesliga players
3. Liga players
Regionalliga players
Oberliga (football) players